The Gwangju Prize for Human Rights is an award given by the South Korean May 18 Memorial Foundation to recognize "individuals, groups or institutions in Korea and abroad that have contributed in promoting and advancing human rights, democracy and peace through their work." The award is intended to commemorate the spirit of the May 1980 Gwangju Democratization Movement (also known as "518" for its 18 May start), in which pro-democracy citizens battled soldiers in protest of the military reign of Chun Doo-hwan. As the organization's website explains, "Gwangju received valuable help from others while undertaking the struggle to examine the truth behind the May 18 uprising, and while striving to develop true democracy. In response, we would like to give something back to those who supported our cause for peace and democracy." As of 2011, the prize carried a cash award of US$50,000.

On December 18, 2018, the May 18 Memorial Foundation announced its cancellation of Suu Kyi's award due to her inaction in ceasing the inhumane acts and human rights atrocities against the Rohingya people.

List of Gwangju Prize for Human Rights Laureates

See also

 Indian Weekender article
 The Jakarta Post article 
 Bulatlat article

References

Free expression awards
Awards established in 2000
Gwangju Uprising